Wee Bee Foolish is an alternative hip hop group from Brighton Beach, Brooklyn, New York, that consists of  Ken Boogaloo, Yesh (a.k.a. Yeshua dapoED), DJ Bless & Xtraordinaire.

Music career
Three members hail from Brighton Beach, Brooklyn, DJ Bless from Queens, in New York City. All of its releases were released on the Head Bop Music label. The group has cited other New York artists such as the Native Tongues, Boogie Down Productions and Juice Crew as influences.

To date, it has released one album, titled Brighton Beach Memoirs, in 2002, as well as a number of singles. However, all four members have released their own solo material, as well as having collaborated with various other artists such as the Sound Providers, Aesop Rock, Siah, Pumpkinhead, and Ace Lover.

Despite remaining underground, the group has garnered a dedicated group of fans and regularly engages its fans on MySpace. According to the official Head Bop Web site, the group has been working on its second album, titled Underdog, for the last three years. It was eventually released in 2007.

Discography
Albums
Brighton Beach Memoirs (Head Bop Music, 2002)
Underdog (Head Bop Music, 2007)

Singles
"Tiger Boogs/Time Will Tell" (1997)
"This Kid/Turn It Out" (2001)
"The Main Attraction/Whatcha Need/Doin' It Up" (2001)
"Maximus/Heavy/Promo '98" (2003)
"Puttin' In Work/What It Is" (2004)

American hip hop groups
Musical groups established in 2002
Musical groups from Brooklyn